Habana is a coastal rural locality in the Mackay Region, Queensland, Australia. In the  Habana had a population of 952 people.

Geography 
Habana is bounded to the north by Sand Bay in the Coral Sea. The land near the sea is low-lying and sugarcane is grown in that area. Heading inland to the south the terrain becomes more mountainous and is predominantly used for grazing on native vegetation.

Habana has the following mountains:

 Barrow Hill 
 Mount Gabrovo 
 Mount Xeromero 
 The Black Mountain 

Habana has the following beaches:

 Neils Beach
 Williamsons Beach
There is a cane tramway network through the locality providing transport of the harvested sugarcane to Farleigh Sugar Mill in neighbouring Farleigh to the south.

History 

The locality takes its name from La Habana sugar plantation established by Edward Maitland Long and William Robertson in 1881 on 6000 acres of land already owned by Long. They built the Habana sugar mill in 1883 and it operated until 1901.

Habana Provisional School opened on 24 September 1883 and closed in 1906. In 1917 Habana State School opened but was destroyed by a cyclone in January 1918. It was decided to rebuild the school at a new  site on the road to Bowen.  It closed on 1960. The school was located at 863 Yakapari Road.

Etowri State School opened  in 1926 and closed circa 1953. It was located at 108 Barcoo Road.

In the 2011 census, Habana had a population of 925 people.

In the  Habana had a population of 952 people.

Heritage listings 
Habana has a number of heritage-listed sites, including:
 Between Habana Wharf Road and Constant Creek: Habana Tramline Causeway and Wharf Site

Education 
There are no schools in Habana. The nearest primary schools are Farleigh State School and Coningsby State School, both in neighbouring Farleigh to the south, and Beaconsfield State School in Beaconsfield to the south-east. The nearest secondary schools are Mackay Northern Beaches State High School in Rural View to the east and Mackay North State High School in North Mackay to the south-east.

Amenities 
The Mackay Regional Council operates a mobile library service on a fortnightly schedule at the corner of Moohin and Habana Roads.

There are a number of parks in the area, including:

 Dolphins Park
 Gardiners Road Park

 Olletts Road Park

See also
 List of tramways in Queensland

References

External links

 

Mackay Region
Localities in Queensland